Tetrakomia was a town of ancient Bithynia.

Its site is located near Keramet in Asiatic Turkey.

References

Populated places in Bithynia
Former populated places in Turkey
History of Bursa Province